Clarence Hillman Robbins Jr. (April 22, 1932 – November 6, 1981) was an American professional golfer who is best known for his amateur career, including winning the 1957 U.S. Amateur.

Early life 
Robbins was born in Memphis, Tennessee. He was the son of Hillman Robbins Sr., a clerk at the Square-D liquor store, also located in Memphis, who was shot to death by paranoid lawyer Glenn Nash on December 6, 1966.

Amateur career 
He played college golf at Memphis State College where he won the NCAA Championship in 1954. In 1957, while on leave from duty in the Air Force, he won the U.S. Amateur at The Country Club in Brookline, Massachusetts, beating Bud Taylor, 5 & 4. He won several other amateur tournaments and played on the 1957 Walker Cup team.

Professional career 
Robbins turned professional in 1958 but did not enjoy as much success as he had as an amateur. He served as the club professional at Galloway Golf Course in Memphis from 1966 until his death in 1981.

Robbins was inducted into the Tennessee Golf Hall of Fame in 1995.

Tournament wins
1951 Western Junior
1953 Tennessee State Amateur, Southeastern Open
1954 Southern Intercollegiate, NCAA Championship, Arkansas Open
1955 Sunnehanna Amateur, Southeastern Open
1956 North and South Amateur, Air Force Championship
1957 U.S. Amateur, All-Services Tournament

U.S. national team appearances
Amateur
Walker Cup: 1957 (winners)
Americas Cup: 1956 (winners), 1958 (winners)

References

American male golfers
Memphis Tigers men's golfers
Golfers from Memphis, Tennessee
1932 births
1981 deaths